Wellington Suburbs was a parliamentary electorate in Wellington, New Zealand. It existed from 1893 to 1902, then from 1908 to 1911, and from 1919 to 1946. The electorate was represented by six Members of Parliament.

Population centres
In the 1892 electoral redistribution, population shift to the North Island required the transfer of one seat from the South Island to the north. The resulting ripple effect saw every electorate established in 1890 have its boundaries altered, and eight electorates were established for the first time, including Wellington Suburbs.

History

Charles Wilson, also of the Liberal Party, was elected MP for Wellington Suburbs following a by-election on 23 April 1897, but retired at the end of the term in 1899. Wellington Suburbs was abolished in 1902, and Wilford successfully contested the  electorate instead.

The electorate was recreated as Wellington Suburbs in 1908 for one parliamentary term, i.e. until 1911.

The electorate was recreated in 1919.

Wright was succeeded by Harry Combs in 1938. He was a member of the Labour Party and represented the electorate for two parliamentary terms until 1946, when it was abolished again.

Members of Parliament
The electorate was represented by six Members of Parliament.

Key

Election results

1943 election

1938 election

1935 election

1931 election

1928 election

1908 election

1899 election

1897 by-election

1896 election

1893 election

Notes

References

Historical electorates of New Zealand
Politics of the Wellington Region
1893 establishments in New Zealand
1902 disestablishments in New Zealand
1946 disestablishments in New Zealand
1911 disestablishments in New Zealand
1908 establishments in New Zealand
1919 establishments in New Zealand